Trylle Trilogy is a young adult paranormal series by American author Amanda Hocking. The trilogy follows the story of Wendy Everly, a 17-year-old girl who stumbles upon another world where she eventually learns of her true identity.

Hocking had originally self-published the series as e-books, selling more than 1.5 million copies. In 2011, St. Martin's Press signed on Hocking and re-released the books, starting with Switched (January 2012), Torn (February 2012) and Ascend (April 2012).

Books
Switched 
Torn
Ascend

Movie adaptation
In October 2014, screenwriter Terri Tatchell (co-writer of District 9) optioned Hocking's Trylle Trilogy and plans to write a screenplay based on the three books.

References

External links
 World of Amanda Hocking

Fantasy novel series
Fantasy novel trilogies